The Indiana District may refer to:

Indiana District (LCMS), in the Lutheran Church–Missouri Synod
Indiana District, Maynas, a district (political subdivision) of Peru